John T. Hughes (1928–1992) was an intelligence officer of the U.S. Defense Intelligence Agency, specializing in Soviet military capabilities and best known for his nationally televised briefing on the removal of Soviet missiles in Cuba, during the Cuban Missile Crisis. A past photo analyst, Hughes had been part of the famous U-2 collection program from the earliest days of its operation. Over the years he personally briefed Presidents John F. Kennedy, Gerald R. Ford, Jimmy Carter and Ronald Reagan on highly classified photographs of Soviet military installations and other sensitive security matters. Hughes guided DIA’s collection and analysis, and served as a principal intelligence adviser to the Secretary of Defense, the Chairman of the Joint Chiefs of Staff, and the Director of the Defense Intelligence Agency.

References

Analysts of the Defense Intelligence Agency
1928 births
1992 deaths
Recipients of the President's Award for Distinguished Federal Civilian Service